The Chief of the General Staff of the Kazakh Armed Forces is the professional head of the Armed Forces of the Republic of Kazakhstan. He/She is the highest-ranking officer in the armed forces. The position was established on November 1992, following the establishment of the armed forces in the summer of that year, two days after the general staff of the national army was established.

List of Chiefs

Chief of the General Staff

Chairmen of the Joint Chiefs of Staff

Chiefs of the General Staff

See also
Armed Forces of the Republic of Kazakhstan
Ministry of Defense (Kazakhstan)

References